Matthew Alfred Wilkins (14 January 1908 – 5 February 1986) was an Australian rules footballer who played with Hawthorn in the Victorian Football League (VFL).

Notes

External links 

1908 births
1986 deaths
Australian rules footballers from Victoria (Australia)
Hawthorn Football Club players
Tatura Football Club players